Christmas creep is a merchandising phenomenon in which merchants and retailers introduce Christmas-themed merchandise or decorations before the traditional start of the holiday shopping season, which in the United States is on the day after Thanksgiving. The term was first used in the mid-1980s.

Economic motivation

The phenomenon is associated with a desire of merchants to take advantage of particularly heavy Christmas-related shopping well before Black Friday in the United States and before Remembrance Day in Canada. The term Black Friday was not used until recently in the UK and Ireland; its increased usage can be traced to the internet being more widespread, as well as growing Americanization, as neither country celebrates Thanksgiving. Previously, retailers referred to Christmas as the "golden quarter", that is, the three months of October through December is the quarter of the year in which the retail industry hopes to make the most profit. The lack of Thanksgiving as a "barrier" between holidays has caused several retailers to put up Christmas sales earlier in the year. For instance, Irish retailer Brown Thomas opens its Christmas store in mid-August.
This phenomenon can apply for other holidays as well, notably Valentine's Day, Easter and Mother's Day. The motivation for holiday creep is for retailers to lengthen their selling interval for seasonal merchandise in order to maximize profit and to give early-bird shoppers a head start on that holiday. However, it is not clear that this practice has been consistently beneficial for retailers.

Seasonal creep is not limited to the northern hemisphere winter holiday season and other popular holidays and observances, but is also becoming more common for merchandise associated with a general season of the year.  Advertising for winter-, spring-, summer-, and fall-related goods generally now begins midway through the previous season. For example, many supermarkets in the United Kingdom begin selling Easter eggs even before Christmas, and in the US, stores begin selling 4th of July products before Easter, and the next major holiday is marketed as soon as or before the previous has ended.  In Canada, there have been protests that marking the Christmas season should be refrained until after the solemn commemorations of Remembrance Day November 11 have been concluded. Such a phenomenon is known under the more general name of holiday creep.

In Australia, shops have been known to have their Christmas merchandise available as early as late September, mainly because older Australians generally don't celebrate Halloween compared to younger Australians, though by the 2010s, Halloween merchandise has cropped up alongside Christmas merchandise during the same periods. The department store David Jones Limited even begins selling Christmas merchandise at the start of September.

United States
In United States retail, the phenomenon was pioneered by stores like Sam's Club, which introduced early Christmas sales to support resellers.  The hardware chain Lowe's followed in 2000 with a policy of setting out Christmas trees and decorations by October 1, mainly because the Halloween and Thanksgiving holidays do not provide enough merchandise or sales to fill retail space between the end of the summer season and the Christmas season.  In 2002–2003, Christmas creep accelerated markedly with retailers such as Walmart, J. C. Penney, and Target beginning their Christmas sales in October.  In 2006 the National Retail Federation, an industry trade group, said that 40 percent of consumers planned to start their holiday shopping before Halloween.  Since the 2010s, there has been a growing trend for retailers to start selling holiday merchandise in mid- to late-September, with retailers such as Walmart, Sam's Club, Kmart, Costco,  J.C. Penney, Sears, and Lowe's now beginning their Christmas sales earlier than October 1.

Broadcasting
Christmas creep has also been cited as a phenomenon in radio broadcasting. Prior to the early 21st century, radio stations commonly began adding some Christmas songs to their regular playlists in early December and then playing an all-Christmas playlist on December 24 and 25. In 2000 some stations began playing an exclusively Christmas format for the entire month of December, a practice that became more widespread in 2001. In subsequent years, such stations have commonly shifted to an all-Christmas playlist after Thanksgiving, or even several weeks earlier. A handful of American radio stations have, since 2006, earned a reputation for regularly switching to Christmas music on November 1, the day after Halloween; as of 2011, this has not become the norm for most of North America (mid-November is the typical start time for Christmas music on most radio stations in both the United States and Canada), and it is still extremely rare to hear stations (other than those pulling a stunt between changing formats) change to Christmas music after October. Earlier flips to Christmas music were noted in 2020 (the first station that year flipped in late September), as broadcasters sought to alleviate some of the stress brought by the COVID-19 pandemic. A sudden reversal of this trend occurred as the pandemic waned in 2022, as no station would adopt the all-Christmas format until October 28—and that station, the lone station to flip before November 1, had largely gone unnoticed until October 30; the trade Web site Radio Insight, which tracks the first-in-the-nation Christmas flips, erroneously stated that "it appears we will make it to Halloween without a radio station already having started playing Christmas music."

Some of the channels on the cable radio service Music Choice begin playing Christmas music continually from the end of Halloween up until the first week of January (in light of the consequences of the Internet age, the network maintains an exclusive Christmas music channel through some providers and their TV Everywhere platform year-round). Likewise, the U.S. cable channel Hallmark Channel usually begins its "Countdown to Christmas" programming event (a continuous marathon of original Christmas movies) on November 1. In 2010, ABC Family began to air some holiday-related programming in mid-November under the banner "Countdown to 25 Days of Christmas"; as a prelude to its main "25 Days of Christmas" event. The network, renamed Freeform, renamed the programming block "Kickoff to Christmas" in 2018, expanding it so that it encompasses the entire month of November. (Freeform cannot move the block into October because its existing Halloween block, "31 Nights of Halloween", occupies the entirety of that month, itself having expanded from its original 13 days.)

Satire
This market trend is satirized in the 1974 animated special It's the Easter Beagle, Charlie Brown, when the characters go shopping at a department store and discover that it has its Christmas displays up in the middle of April, including a sign forewarning that there were only a mere 246 days left until Christmas. Additionally, in 1973's A Charlie Brown Thanksgiving, Sally complains that she was looking for a turkey tree for Thanksgiving but had only found Christmas supplies.

Several songs satirize the phenomenon, including Loudon Wainwright III's "Suddenly It's Christmas" (from his 1993 live album Career Moves), Straight No Chaser's "The Christmas Can-Can" (from their 2009 album Christmas Cheers), Paul and Storm's "The Way-Too-Early Christmas Song" (from their 2010 album Do You Like Star Wars?). Christian singer/songwriter Brandon Heath voiced his feelings on Christmas creep in the song "The Day After Thanksgiving" (from his 2013 album Christmas Is Here). Randy Brooks, best known as the author of "Grandma Got Run Over by a Reindeer," recorded "It's Halloween (A Christmas Song)," which remarked upon the increasing trend of entering the Christmas season immediately after Halloween ends, facetiously forgetting what Thanksgiving is, lamenting the season is only eight weeks long, noting that Valentine's Day celebrations will begin on December 26, and musing that next year's Christmas celebrations might begin on Labor Day.

In Jim Butcher's 2012 novel Cold Days, Santa Claus himself declares that he's drawing the line at Halloween.

See also
Criticism of Thanksgiving
Mission creep
Season creep

Further reading

References

Creep
1980s neologisms